Titan Agung Bagus Fawwazi (born 5 June 2001) is an Indonesian professional footballer who plays as a forward for Liga 1 club Bhayangkara.

Club career

Arema
He then joined the Arema Academy and played for the club at youth levels. During the 2019 season, Agung scored 2 goals in 8 appearances for the under-20s. Agung made his professional debut for Arema in the Indonesian Liga 1 on 2 March 2020, against TIRA-Persikabo where he played as a substitute.

Bhayangkara
On 18 February 2020, Titan Agung officially joined with Bhayangkara after resigning from Arema. He made his league debut on 29 September 2021 as a substitute in a match against Persik Kediri at the Gelora Bung Karno Madya Stadium, Jakarta. On 5 December 2022, Titan Agung scored his first league goal in the 2022–23 Liga 1 for Bhayangkara in a 3–1 victory over PSS Sleman at the Jatidiri Stadium. He scored his league goal for the club, opening the scoring in a 2–1 loss against RANS Nusantara on 16 December 2022 at Maguwoharjo Stadium.

On 19 January 2023, he scored in a 2–3 lose over Persik Kediri.

Career statistics

Club

Notes

Honours

Club
Arema
 Indonesia President's Cup: 2019

References

External links
 
 Titan Agung at Liga Indonesia

2001 births
Living people
Sportspeople from East Java
Sportspeople from Malang
Indonesian footballers
Association football forwards
Arema F.C. players
Bhayangkara F.C. players 
Liga 1 (Indonesia) players